Christian Saceanu was the defending champion, but lost in the second round to Richard Krajicek.

Michael Stich won the title by defeating Jonathan Stark 6–4, 7–5 in the final.

Seeds

Draw

Finals

Top half

Bottom half

References

External links
 Official results archive (ATP)
 Official results archive (ITF)

Rosmalen Grass Court Championships
1992 ATP Tour